Leptogium rivulare, also called the flooded jellyskin lichen, is a species of lichen belonging to the family Collemataceae.

It is native to Europe and Northern America.

References

Lichen species
rivulare
Taxa named by Erik Acharius